Chamba is a town in the Northern Region of Ghana.

Notable sons
Dominic Nitiwul - Minister of Defence of Ghana.

References

Northern Region (Ghana)
Villages in Ghana